Zobel may refer to:

 Zobel, a mountain range in the Ethiopian district of Kobo
 Zobel (surname), including a list of people with the name
 Zobel network constant resistance networks invented by Otto Zobel
 Zobel de Ayala family of the Philippines
 A nickname of the De La Salle-Santiago Zobel School in Muntinlupa, Philippines, named after a member of the Zobel de Ayala family.
 The German name for sable
 The German Zobel-class fast attack craft